Fight of Gods is a fighting game by Taiwanese indie developer Digital Crafter consisting of a roster of figures pertaining to world religions and mythologies. The game was banned in Malaysia and Singapore due to religious content. It was released in Japan on December 24, 2020.

Playable Characters
 Amaterasu
 Anubis
 Athena
 Beliar (exclusive to the Arcade version)
 Buddha (name changed to "Zen" in the PS4 version)
 Freyja
 GuanGong
 Jesus (name changed to "Saint" in the PS4 version)
 Lamia (hidden character; guest fighter from Lamia's Game Room)
 Mazu
 Moses (name changed to "Wisdom" in the PS4 version)
 Odin
 Santa Claus
 Sif
 Susanoo
 Tudigong
 Zeus

References

External links

2017 video games
Fighting games
Cultural depictions of Gautama Buddha
Cultural depictions of Jesus
Obscenity controversies in video games
Video games developed in Taiwan
Nintendo Switch games
Windows games
Video games based on multiple mythologies